Geodermatophilus is a Gram-positive genus of bacteria from the phylum Actinomycetota.

Species
Geodermatophilus comprises the following species:
 G. africanus Montero-Calasanz et al. 2013
 G. amargosae Montero-Calasanz et al. 2014
 G. aquaeductus Hezbri et al. 2015
 G. arenarius Montero-Calasanz et al. 2013

 G. bullaregiensis Hezbri et al. 2015
 G. chilensis Castro et al. 2020
 G. daqingensis Wang et al. 2017
 G. dictyosporus Montero-Calasanz et al. 2015
 G. marinus Li et al. 2019
 G. nigrescens Nie et al. 2012
 G. normandii Montero-Calasanz et al. 2013
 G. obscurus Luedemann 1968 (Approved Lists 1980)

 G. poikilotrophus corrig. Montero-Calasanz et al. 2015
 G. pulveris Hezbri et al. 2016
 G. ruber Zhang et al. 2011
 G. sabuli Hezbri et al. 2015
 G. saharensis Montero-Calasanz et al. 2013
 G. siccatus Montero-Calasanz et al. 2013

 G. telluris Montero-Calasanz et al. 2013

 G. tzadiensis Montero-Calasanz et al. 2013

References

Actinomycetia
Bacteria genera